The River Ogmore is a river in South Wales that is popular with anglers. It runs generally from north to south from the Ogmore Vale and Gilfach Goch, past Bridgend and Ogmore. The River Ogmore rises at Craig Ogwr (527 m) in the Ogmore Valley as the Ogwr Fawr before it links with the Ogwr Fach at Blackmill. The River Llynfi, the River Garw and finally the River Ewenny in its estuary are all tributaries of the Ogmore which flows into the sea between Ogmore-by-Sea and the Merthyr Mawr sand-dunes.

Geology and geography 

Most of the headwaters flow over Carboniferous coal measures overlain by glacial drift and fluvial gravels. The valleys are reasonably broad for a small river, and many of the tributaries meandered through their valleys in the past. The considerable urbanisation, especially in the 19th century, confined most rivers to rather narrow artificial channels, bordered in places such as Bridgend with concrete flood protection walls.

Major tributaries

River Llynfi
The River Llynfi,  runs for around 10 miles from its source north of Maesteg and flows generally southwards through the Llynfi Valley to the confluence with the River Ogmore at Aberkenfig.

River Garw
The River Garw flows broadly north-south and runs through Pontycymer to its confluence with the Ogmore (Ogwr) at Brynmenyn.

River Ewenny

The Ewenny River rises to the north-east of Bridgend town and flows through Pencoed and Coychurch before entering the River Ogmore estuary just below Ogmore Castle.

Environment
The industrialisation of the valley of the Ogmore by mining and heavy industry severely damaged much of the natural environment of the river. However, there has been an improvement in recent years and it supports a healthy population of aquatic invertebrates. The river does still have some problems though, including its proximity to major industrial plants, insensitive development and invasive weeds.

Estuary

Until some years ago, the adjacent sewage works discharged effluents into the estuary, but the water outlets have since been treated with ultraviolet light and do not flow frequently into the river. However, in periods of heavy rain, emergency outfalls pour into the river, releasing some sewage.

Fishery
In its industrial heyday, the Ogmore had no salmonid fish along much of its length, although brown trout survived in many of the smaller tributaries.

From the 1980s onwards, salmon and sea-trout started returning to the main river and the River Garw in ever-increasing numbers, but continued to avoid the chronically polluted Llynfi. However, even on the Llynfi, native brown trout numbers increased upstream of Tondu, and these were occasionally supplemented by stocked rainbow trout. In all parts of the river, trout can now be found, with salmon and sea trout almost everywhere. In addition eels remain common, and millers thumb, gudgeon, stone loach and minnow are found throughout.

References

External links 
www.geograph.co.uk : photos of the River Ogmore
www.geograph.co.uk : photos of the River Ewenny and surrounding area

Rivers of Bridgend County Borough
Rivers of the Vale of Glamorgan